Rüfenacht is a locality enclosed in the municipality of  Worb in the district of  Konolfingen of the canton Bern, Switzerland.

Rüfenacht lies on the west side of Worb alongside of the road between Worb and  Luzern. Over the time, Rüfenacht has become a suburb of Berne, although it belongs to the municipality of Worb.
The village counted 3,420 inhabitants on August 31, 2006. It lies at an altitude of around 600 meters, next to Gümligen and Worb.

External links
 Website of the municipality of Worb
 Image of Rüfenacht

Villages in the canton of Bern